Fontinalis dalecarlica is a species of moss belonging to the family Fontinalaceae.

It is native to Eurasia and Northern America.

References

Hypnales